Páll Vang (8 August 1949 – 3 January 2023) was a Faroese politician. A member of the People's Party, he served as Minister of Agriculture, Health, Transport and Justice from 1981 to 1985.

Vang died on 3 January 2023, at the age of 73.

References

1949 births
2023 deaths
People's Party (Faroe Islands) politicians
20th-century Danish politicians
Members of the Løgting
Government ministers of the Faroe Islands
Health ministers of the Faroe Islands
People from Tvøroyri